"Never Say Die (Give a Little Bit More)" is a song by Cliff Richard that was released in the UK in May 1983 as the lead single from Richard's 25th Anniversary 1983 album Silver. The song reached number 15 on the UK Singles Chart, and did better in Norway in reaching number 9 and in Sweden reaching number 13.

The song is written by Terry Britten and Sue Shifrin. Terry Britten is the songwriter who had written Richard's 1976 hit "Devil Woman" and 1980 hit "Carrie".

Chart performance

References

1983 songs
1983 singles
Cliff Richard songs
Songs written by Terry Britten
EMI Records singles